John W. Breen (May 9, 1907 – February 9, 1984) was an American football and basketball player, coach, and executive.  He was active in the college ranks before becoming an administrator in the American Football League for the Houston Oilers.

Playing career
Breen grew up in Milwaukee, Wisconsin and played high school football at Milwaukee East Division High School.  He then went on to Carroll College in Waukesha, Wisconsin where he was named "most valuable player" and team captain in both football and basketball.

Coaching career

Carroll
After graduation from Carroll in 1935, Breen began coaching freshman teams and teaching classes  Breen was the 19th head football coach, serving held that for 11 seasons, from 1938 until 1948.

Lake Forest
In 1949, Breen became the head coach at Lake Forest College in Lake Forest, Illinois and held the position for three seasons, through 1951.  During his tenure as head coach, he accumulated a record of 9–13–2.  While at Lake Forest he received nationwide publicity for defending the interests of small college athletics.  In 1974, Lake Forest inducted him into their athletic "Hall of Fame" for his contribution to the football and basketball programs at the school.

Professional sports
After a successful college career as an educator and coach, Breen went into the professional ranks with the Chicago Cardinals of the National Football League (NFL) as director of player personnel in 1957.  He was later the first person hired by the Houston Oilers in 1960 as director of player personnel and was named general manager in 1971 and he held that position until his retirement in 1973.

Breen was instrumental in the building of the Oilers and the American Football League (AFL) itself by being in charge of the league's first draft of players.  He is credited with recruiting veteran players George Blanda, John Carson, and Willard Dewveall along with first-year players Billy Cannon, Dan Lanphear, and Charley Hennigan.  He recognized that the competing NFL teams would cut good quality players, and he recruited them to play at Houston.

After his retirement from professional football management, Breen worked as a sports broadcaster for radio station KTRH in Houston, Texas.

Head coaching record

References

1907 births
1984 deaths
American football quarterbacks
American men's basketball players
Basketball coaches from Wisconsin
Basketball players from Milwaukee
Carroll Pioneers athletic directors
Carroll Pioneers football coaches
Carroll Pioneers football players
Carroll Pioneers men's basketball coaches
Carroll Pioneers men's basketball players
Houston Oilers executives
Lake Forest Foresters athletic directors
Lake Forest Foresters football coaches
National Football League general managers
Sportspeople from Milwaukee
Players of American football from Milwaukee